The Daytime Emmy Award for Outstanding Musical Performance in a Daytime Program was an award presented annually by the National Academy of Television Arts and Sciences (NATAS) and Academy of Television Arts & Sciences (ATAS). 

It was first awarded at  the 43rd Daytime Creative Arts Emmy Awards in 2016 when the award was originally called Outstanding Musical Performance in a Talk Show/Morning Program and was first presented to Rachel Platten for her performance of her hit single "Fight Song" on the morning program Good Morning America. The Award honors the work of a musical artist and the Program’s production of the performance. With the current title award name that was established in 2017, on-camera musical performances from any appropriate Daytime show and several entries for performances by different musical artists appearing on a program are eligible to enter the competition, rather than just a talk show or morning program. 

The award was removed in November of 2019 after category changes were announced.

The Emmy was named after an "Immy", an affectionate term used to refer to the image orthicon camera tube. The statuette was designed by Louis McManus, who modeled the award after his wife, Dorothy. The Emmy statuette is fifteen inches tall from base to tip. The statuette weighs 5 pounds and is composed of iron, pewter, zinc and gold.

Winners and nominees

Listed below are the winners of the award for each year, as well as the other nominees.

{| class="wikitable" style="text-align: center;" rowspan="2" background: #f6e39c;
|- style="background:#bebebe;"
! scope="col" style="width:7%;" | Year
! scope="col" style="width:30%;" | Performer(s)
! scope="col" style="width:30%;" | Program
! scope="col" style="width:30%;" | Performed
! scope="col" style="width:10%;" | Network
! scope="col" style="width:1%;" class="unsortable" |
|-
! rowspan="5" scope="row" style="text-align:center" | 2016 (43rd)
| style="background:#FAEB86" |Rachel Platten 
| style="background:#FAEB86" |Good Morning America
| style="background:#FAEB86" | "Fight Song"
| style="background:#FAEB86" |
|
|- 
|Adele
|Today Show
| "Million Years Ago"
| style="text-align:center;" |NBC
| rowspan="4" |
|- 
|Annie Lennox
|The Talk
| "I Put a Spell on You"
| style="text-align:center;" |CBS
|- 
|ELO
|CBS This Morning Saturday
| "When I Was a Boy"
| style="text-align:center;" |CBS
|-  
|Bruno Mars & Mark Ronson
|The Ellen DeGeneres Show
| "Uptown Funk"
| style="text-align:center;" |Syndicated
|-
! rowspan="6" scope="row" style="text-align:center" | 2017 (44th)
|-
| style="background:#FAEB86" |Cynthia Erivo & the Cast of The Color Purple
| style="background:#FAEB86" |Today Show
| style="background:#FAEB86" | "The Color Purple"
| style="background:#FAEB86" |NBC
| style="text-align:center;" |
|- 
|Charles Bradley
|CBS This Morning Saturday
| "Ain't a Sin" / "The World (Is Going Up In Flames)" / "Changes"
| style="text-align:center;" |CBS
| rowspan="4" |
|- 
|Michael Bublé
|Live! with Kelly
| "Nobody but Me"
| style="text-align:center;" |Syndicated
|- 
|Pentatonix
|Rachael Ray
| "God Rest Ye Merry Gentlemen"
| style="text-align:center;" |Syndicated
|- 
|St. Paul and The Broken Bones
|CBS This Morning Saturday
| "All I Ever Wonder" / "Flow With It"
| style="text-align:center;" |CBS
|-
! rowspan="6" scope="row" style="text-align:center" | 2018 (45th)
|-
| style="background:#FAEB86" |Ben Platt & the Cast of Dear Evan Hansen
| style="background:#FAEB86" |Today Show
| style="background:#FAEB86" | "You Will Be Found"
| style="background:#FAEB86" |NBC
| style="text-align:center;" |
|- 
|Andra Day and Common
|The View
| "Rise Up"
| style="text-align:center;" |ABC
| rowspan="4" |
|- 
|Jason Isbell and The 400 Unit
|CBS This Morning Saturday
| "Cumberland Gap" / "If We Were Vampires"
| style="text-align:center;" |CBS
|- 
|Robert Randolph and the Family Band
|Rachael Ray
| "Love Do What It Do"
| style="text-align:center;" |Syndicated
|- 
|Pharrell Williams
|The Ellen DeGeneres Show
| "Runnin"
| style="text-align:center;" |Syndicated
|-
! scope="row" rowspan=6 style="text-align:center" | 2019 <small>(46th)'</small>	
| style="background:#FAEB86" |  Cast of The Band's Visit| style="background:#FAEB86" |Today Show| style="background:#FAEB86" |"Answer Me"
| style="background:#FAEB86" |NBC	
|rowspan=6| 
|-
|Adrienne Houghton, Israel Houghton 
|The Real|"Secrets"
|Syndicated
|-
|Lindsey Stirling
|Live with Kelly and Ryan|"Dance of the Sugar Plum Fairy"
|Syndicated
|-
|Ashley McBryde
|CBS This Morning Saturday|"Girl Goin' Nowhere / American Scandal"
|CBS
|-
|Ben Rector
|Pickler & Ben|"Old Friends"
|CMT
|}

Series with most nominations

5 nominationsCBS This Morning Saturday4 nominationsToday Show2 nominationsThe Ellen DeGeneres ShowRachael RaySeries with most wins

3 winsToday Show1 winGood Morning America''

References

External links
 Daytime Emmy Awards at the Internet Movie Database

Musical Performance in a Daytime Program
Awards established in 2016
2016 establishments in the United States
Awards disestablished in 2019
American music awards